Hermann Blaß (transliterated as Hermann Blass; 1888–1941) was an Austrian film actor and singer. The Jewish Blaß was forced to leave Germany following the rise of the Nazi Party to power in 1933. He then left Austria following its annexation by Germany in 1938 and went to the United States, where he died in 1941.

Selected filmography
 War in Peace (1925)
 Dolly Gets Ahead (1930)
 The Singing City (1930)
 The Copper (1930)
 A Student's Song of Heidelberg (1930)
 The Road to Dishonour (1930)
 The Stolen Face (1930)
 Lieutenant, Were You Once a Hussar? (1930)
 Once I Loved a Girl in Vienna (1931)
 The Man in Search of His Murderer (1931)
 The Opera Ball (1931)
 The Little Escapade (1931)
 Circus Life (1931)
 Johnny Steals Europe (1932)
 Once There Was a Waltz (1932)
 Two Hearts Beat as One (1932)
 When Love Sets the Fashion (1932)
 Trenck (1932)
 Grandstand for General Staff (1932)
 Modern Dowry (1932)
 The Leap into the Void (1932)
 Scandal in Budapest (1933)
 Jumping into the Abyss (1933)
 Ball at the Savoy (1935)

References

Bibliography
 Eisner, Lotte H. The Haunted Screen: Expressionism in the German Cinema and the Influence of Max Reinhardt. University of California Press, 1969.

External links

1888 births
1941 deaths
Austrian male film actors
Austrian male silent film actors
20th-century Austrian male actors
Jewish emigrants from Austria to the United States after the Anschluss